Dead or Alive is a 1944 American Western film directed by Elmer Clifton and written by Harry L. Fraser. The film stars Tex Ritter, Dave O'Brien, Guy Wilkerson, Marjorie Clements, Rebel Randall and Ray Bennett. The film was released on November 9, 1944, by Producers Releasing Corporation.

Plot

Cast          
Tex Ritter as Tex Haines / Idaho Kid
Dave O'Brien as Dave Wyatt
Guy Wilkerson as Panhandle Perkins
Marjorie Clements as Arline Arthur
Rebel Randall as Belle Loper 
Ray Bennett as Clint Yackey 
Charles King as Red Avery 
Bud Osborne as Tom Carter
Henry Hall as Judge Henry Wright
Ted Mapes as Luke Brown

References

External links
 

1944 films
1940s English-language films
American Western (genre) films
1944 Western (genre) films
Producers Releasing Corporation films
Films directed by Elmer Clifton
American black-and-white films
1940s American films